Par Is Dil Ko Kaise Samjaye is an Indian television series based on the story of two sisters whose lives get dramatically affected by a series of accidents brought about through sheer fate. The series premiered on Sony TV on 29 March 2002, and aired every Friday at 8:30pm IST.

Plot
Neelam brings up her younger sister Aarti after the death of their parents, and brings her sister to her in-laws house after marriage and gets ample support of her in-laws and her husband (Vikram). The story takes turmoil when Aarti marries Vikram after Neelam is presumed to have died in an accident. However, later it is revealed that Neelam is not dead, she returns home after a few years and learns that her sister has married her husband. So she decides to leave their lives.

Cast
Shweta Salve
Pooja Ghai
Rajsingh Verma
Dinesh Kaushik
Rushad Rana

References

External links
Par Is Dil Ko Kaise Samjaye Official Site on Sony Entertainment Network

Sony Entertainment Television original programming
Indian drama television series
Indian television soap operas
2002 Indian television series debuts
2002 Indian television series endings